Mubarak Al-Kabeer Hospital (Arabic:  مستشفى مبارك الكبير) is a general hospital built in Jabriya, Kuwait in 1982. The hospital was named after Shiekh Mubarak Al-Kabeer Al-Sabah. It serves the Hawalli Governorate and covers about 700,000 people in the area. It consists of all departments. All the nationalities living in Kuwait can go in this hospital. All patients who come in the hospital should bring their CIVIL ID CARD.

References

Hospital buildings completed in 1982
Hospitals in Kuwait
Hospitals established in 1982
1982 establishments in Kuwait